Stefan Nagy (31 July 1951 – 23 June 2016) was a former Swedish darts player who competed in British Darts Organisation events.

Career

At the 1992 BDO World Darts Championship he was defeated 3–0 by Rod Harrington in the first round. 2002 saw Nagy's return to Lakeside, where he beat Gary Anderson in the first round 3-0 but lost in the last 16 to Wayne Mardle. He made his third and final appearance in 2003 where he lost in the first round to Andy Fordham.

Injury

Nagy's last tournament was the 2006 Finnish Open. Stefan Nagy had an accident with an electric motorbike in the summer of 2006 which left him paralyzed for six months (he broke his neck). He subsequently recovered sufficiently to be able to walk, but he was never able to play darts again due to his handicap.

Death

Nagy died of cancer on 23 June 2016.

World Championship results

BDO

 1992: 1st round (lost to Rod Harrington 0–3)
 2002: 2nd round (lost to Wayne Mardle 1–3)
 2003: 1st round (lost to Andy Fordham 0–3)

External links
Profile and stats on Darts Database

1961 births
Swedish darts players
Living people
British Darts Organisation players
Sportspeople from Stockholm